Suining County is a county in the Province of Hunan, China, it is under the administration of Shaoyang City. Located in the southwest of the province, the county is bordered to the north by Dongkou County, to the west by Huitong and Jingzhou Counties, to the southwest by Tongdao County, to the southeast by Chengbu County, to the east by Wugang City. The county has nine towns and eight townships under its jurisdiction, the county seat is the town of Changpu.

Administrative divisions
8 towns
 Changpu
 Huangtukuang
 Jinwutang
 Lixiqiao
 Tangjiafang
 Wawutang
 Wuyang
 Hongyan

1 township
 Shuikou

8 townships
 Changpuzi
 Dongshan
 Egongshan
 Guanxia
 Hekou
 Le'anpu
 Matang
 Zhaishi

Languages
In Suining County, ethnic Yao live in Lianmin 联民乡, Shuikou 水口乡, and Jinwutang 金屋塘乡 townships. The dialect of Xiaohuang, Tianluoxuan Village, Lianmin Township is included in the Suining County Gazetteer (1997).

Chinese dialects are spoken by the ethnic Miao of Guanxia 关峡苗族乡 and Matang 麻塘苗族乡 ethnic Miao townships.

Climate

References

www.xzqh.org

External links

 
County-level divisions of Hunan
Shaoyang